The following highways are numbered 11B:

Canada
Ontario Highway 11B

India
  National Highway 11B (India)

United States
 New Hampshire Route 11B
 New York State Route 11B
 County Route 11B (Otsego County, New York)